
Paravani lake is a volcanic lake in Georgia, located in Javakheti Plateau between Abul-Samsari and Javakheti Ranges.

Geography and hydrography
The water level is low during October and November and is high during May and June.

In addition to the small rivers of Shaori, Sabadostskali, and Rodionovskis Tskali, the lake gets its water from snow, rain, and underground springs.

The river Paravani begins from the southern part of the lake, and connects to the Mtkvari to the right. The lake is a popular destination for fishing.

Mystery of lake Paravani
Spectral analysis show, that deep in the lake abyss lies a mysterious object. It appears of ancient origin. Scientists consider it dated to the Bronze age at least. Geophysical studies shows this large structure at the bottom of lake Paravani.

References

External links
 Paravani lake location on the map

Lakes of Georgia (country)
Geography of Samtskhe–Javakheti